HSwMS Malmö was a destroyer of the Royal Swedish Navy that served during the Second World War and in the Cold War. The destroyer served during the war on neutrality patrols and escorts, as well as the evacuation of Gotland in 1941. After the war, the ship was upgraded multiple times. Armament was improved with the introduction of the Bofors 40 mm anti-aircraft gun in 1951 and the Squid mortar ten years later. The latter followed the redefinition of Malmö as an anti-submarine frigate. The ship served in that role for a short time, being decommissioned on 1 February 1965 and broken up as the part of a wider Swedish naval programme of retiring destroyers and frigates.

Design and development

The first of this second batch was Malmö.

Power was provided by three Penhoët oil-fired boilers feeding two de Laval geared steam turbines driving two shafts. The ship had two funnels. In trials, the destroyer exceeded this, reaching .

The main armament consisted of three  K/45 M24C dual-purpose guns produced by Bofors. These were placed in separate mounts on the ship's centreline, with one on the forecastle, one aft and one between the funnels. Air defence consisted six  M/40 autocannons in three twin mounts, also provided by Bofors. Two triple rotating torpedo tube mounts for  torpedoes were aft of the superstructure and two depth charge throwers were carried further towards the stern. Approximately forty mines could also be carried for minelaying. The ship had a complement of 135 officers and ratings.

Construction and career
Malmö was laid down by Eriksbergs Mekaniska Verkstad in Gothenburg, launched on 22 September 1938 and commissioned on 15 August the following year. Named after the city, the ship was allocated the pennant number J7 and joined the Coastal Fleet. During the Second World War, Malmö was involved in patrolling Swedish waters to protect Swedish neutrality. The vessel also provided escort to merchant ships travelling in Swedish waters and, during October 1941, was involved in the evacuation of Gotland to Nynäshamn.

At the end of the war, Malmö remained in service for another five years until, between 1950 and 1951, being given a substantial modernisation. The bridge was enlarged and better fire control was fitted, along with a tripod with radar to replace the pole mast. The armament was updated. The central gun was moved aft to a superfiring position. This greatly enhanced the operational capability as the funnels had restricted fire. The anti-aircraft guns were replaced with four single Bofors  L/70 guns. 

Malmö was rerated a frigate on 1 January 1961 along with the rest of the class. The ship was taken out of service and once again upgraded. The central gun and the torpedo tubes were replaced by two Squid anti-submarine mortars and four more single Bofors  L/70 guns were mounted around the aft funnel. The frigate reentered service in 1962 and was used in an anti-submarine role with the pennant number F78. During the 1960s, the Swedish Navy decided to retire the larger frigates in the fleet as newer missile-equipped fast attack craft became the mainstay of the surface fleet. Malmö was decommissioned on 1 February 1965 and subsequently broken up.

References

Citations

Bibliography

 
 
 
 
 
 
 
 
 
 
 
 
 

1940 ships
Destroyers of the Swedish Navy
Ships built in Gothenburg
World War II naval ships of Sweden